Jan van de Ven (September 18, 1925 in Venlo – October 29, 2013) was a Dutch politician. He was a member of the House of Representatives from 1976 to 1981.

References

1925 births
2013 deaths
Dutch businesspeople
Members of the House of Representatives (Netherlands)
People from Venlo
People's Party for Freedom and Democracy politicians